The 8th Saturn Awards were awarded to media properties and personalities deemed by the Academy to be the best in science fiction, fantasy and horror in 1980. They were awarded in July 1981.

Winners and nominees 
Below is a complete list of nominees and winners. Winners are highlighted in bold.

Film awards

Special awards

Golden Scroll of Merit (Outstanding Achievement)
 Sybil Danning – Battle Beyond the Stars

Outstanding Film Award
 Harlequin

Life Career Award
 John Agar

Executive Achievement Award
 Charles Couch

Service Award
 Natalie Harris

Best New Star Award
 Sam J. Jones

External links
 Official Saturn Awards website
 https://www.imdb.com/event/ev0000004/1981

Saturn Awards ceremonies
Saturn
Saturn